In Islam, the Woman prayer represents the peculiarities, specificities and characteristics of the Islamic prayer (salat) that is performed by a woman.

Presentation

The prayer that a woman performs in Islam to draw close to God (Allah) Almighty is considered completely equal to the prayer that her brother in humanity and Islam, the man, performs.

As for the feminine specificity of a Muslim woman when she performs prayer, Muslim jurists (fuqaha) have spoken about it in the chapters on women's matters and what is related to them from all sides, and they collected what is in the Book of God (Quran) and the Sunnah of Muhammad, as well as the sayings of scholars and jurists, from hadiths and comments regarding them.

Reward

The total reward (thawab) of a woman who is praying is completely identical to the total reward of a man, because God Almighty will hold her accountable for the amount of prayers she performed on the days imposed on her before her menstruation and postpartum, and when her menstruation comes, it does not prevent her from reward, so no one of the men should say that the woman lacks the reward.

The meaning of a woman's lack of rituals (salah) is that the religious assignments for her are less than the duties of a man, but reward and punishment come throughout the course of each gender fulfilling the duty of assigning it, if she assigns her, she will take the full reward, and if the man assigns him, he will also take the full reward.

Based on that, it is not permissible to say that a woman is deficient in the reward for prayer, because God has not made her a reward that he would prevent him from doing on the days on which he was obliged not to pray.

Menstruation

God does not hold a woman accountable for not performing the obligatory prayer on her, because He is the One who granted her a clear and binding permission not to pray during her menstrual cycle and not to fast, and she is neither counted nor punished for her lack of prayer.

But if the woman suffers from runny and flowing blood (istihadha), then if the time for menstruation cycle comes, she should leave the prayer until the usual time for her period ends, and if the period ends, she should do the washing (ghusl) from the blood and then perform the usual obligatory prayer (fard).

Hijab

The dress of a Muslim woman in prayer is with a legal veil (hijab) covering all of her body except for the face and hands, as stated in the hadith narrated by Imam Al-Tirmidhi in his book Jami' al-Tirmidhi on the authority of the Mother of the Believers, Aisha bint Abi Bakr, may God be pleased with them both.

The Mother of the Believers, Umm Salama, may God be pleased with her, said that a woman should pray in a hijab consisting of the veil and a shield or a robe so that the backs of her feet are covered from the view of others.

Congregation

On the subject of women praying in the mosque with men in group prayer, Imam Al-Ghazali said in his book The Revival of the Religious Sciences what he wrote:

The Mother of the Believers, Aisha bint Abi Bakr prevented women from attending group prayers in the mosques, and she was told that the Messenger of God, may God bless him and grant him peace, would not prevent them from joining the congregation, and she said: « If the Messenger of God knew, peace be upon him, what women made of adornment after him, he prevented them ».

If security is available, and the woman wants to leave her house to attend group prayers in the mosque, then she must correct the intention (niyya) that she did not go out to watch and spawn under the pretext of prayer, in order to achieve sincerity (ikhlas) in worship (ibadah), and she must not wear the clothing of scandal, adornment and luscious colors, and she must not use perfume It has an aphrodisiac scent in men.

However, the trustworthy jurists (fuqaha) understood from Aisha’s words that preventing women from mosques is not absolute, because the authentic hadiths contradict that, as there is no point in preventing an old woman in vulgar clothing from attending group prayer.

And if the rows of women came directly behind the ranks of men during the era of the Prophet Muhammad, may God bless him and grant him peace, then in recent times a barrier must be established between men and women that prevents one from looking, because that also is a suspicion of alienation, and customs bear witness to these evils.

In general, the jurists have said that it is forbidden (makruh) to attend the mosque for a desirable female or young woman, not other women whom men do not find desires.

Voice

A woman's voice is not a shame (awrah) because the Quran permitted talking to the Muhammad's wives from behind a veil (hijab), despite the emphasis on the necessity of piety (taqwa) while talking to women.

Some of the jurists who prevent women from speaking out during the prayers quoted the hadith of Abu Hurairah as evidence:

So these scholars used this hadith as evidence for the prohibition or dislike for a woman to raise her voice so that men can hear her.

It seems that the hadith banning loudness is concerned with prayer alone, because the state of prayer is the state of communion (munajat), so it is not necessary for a man to think of any of the meanings of desire, as Imam Al-Sarakhsi says.

This means that men outside of prayer can hear a woman's voice without being embarrassed, but women are prevented from speaking out in tasbih during prayer because they are absolutely instructed to lower their voices in prayer.

And this is what was previously mentioned if men are in the presence of the woman who is praying, except that many women recite in silence in the prayer aloud, and they avoid hearing themselves even in the absence of men, and this is contrary to the Sunnah because reciting out loud in the loud prayers is the fixed Sunnah of Muhammad.

As for the silent and aloud recitation, it is likewise there is no difference between a man and a woman, because the night prayers are loudly and the daytime prayers are silently for both, except that as stated above, if a woman has someone who hears her voice from among the men, then she is pleased with the recitation (tilawa) and does not raise her voice for fear of being tempted by her, but if she is not in the presence of men, then it is okay for her to recite out loud in the night prayer.

Imam

Islam allowed women to pray as a female Imam with women and non-adult children, and allowed her to read aloud due to the absence of men from the congregational prayer (Salah al jama'ah) that she leads.

This is because it is not correct for males to follow the female Imam, because males follow a man only as an Imam, and for women it is correct for them to follow a man as their imam in prayer.

With regard to the Sharia ruling on a woman leading a male boy, the jurisprudential saying is that it is not permissible for a woman to be a man's imam, whether he is young or old.

See also

References

Salah
Salah terminology
Islam and women
Women and religion
Women's rights
Women's health